is a Ryukyuan gusuku in Nanjō, Okinawa. It was built by Shō Shishō and served as the home of the Aji of Sashiki Magiri. During the Taishō era, a Shinto shrine was built over the remains of the main hall. Unlike most gusuku, which are known for high stone walls, the remains of such walls have not been found at Sashiki Castle by archaeologists.

References

Castles in Okinawa Prefecture